Rajawali is an Indonesian soap opera television series, produced by SinemArt. It debuted on RCTI on September 7, 2015, with its final episode airing October 5, 2015.

Cast 
 Giorgino Abraham as Sakti
 Irish Bella as Lembayung
 Verrel Bramasta as Panji
 Baim Wong as Satria/Rajawali
 Natasha Wilona as Mentari
 Bella Shofie as Ratu Buaya Putih
 Kevin Kambey as Braga
 Aryani Fitriana as Bunga
 Windy Wulandari as Tiara
 Marcella Daryanani as Indah
 Fathir Muchtar as Bayu Aji
 Fendi Perdana as Ki Arang
 Donny Kesuma as Rusdi/Ki Gledek
 Anika Hakim as Nyi Waras
 Ine Dewi as Sekar
 Rizky Billar as Rizky

References

External links 
  Situs web SinemArt

2015 Indonesian television series debuts
2015 Indonesian television series endings
Indonesian drama television series
Indonesian television soap operas
RCTI original programming